Nadezhda Mikhaylova (born 10 October 1934) is a Bulgarian cross-country skier. She competed in two events at the 1964 Winter Olympics.

References

External links
 

1934 births
Living people
Bulgarian female cross-country skiers
Olympic cross-country skiers of Bulgaria
Cross-country skiers at the 1964 Winter Olympics
People from Pernik